Tuoro sul Trasimeno is a comune (municipality) in the province of Perugia in the Italian region Umbria, located about 25 km northwest of Perugia.

Tuoro sul Trasimeno borders the following municipalities: Castiglione del Lago, Cortona, Lisciano Niccone, Magione, Passignano sul Trasimeno. It is located on the northern shore of the Lake Trasimeno.

References

External links
 Official website

Cities and towns in Umbria